James Ronald "Bunkie" Blackburn (April 22, 1936 – February 28, 2006) was a NASCAR racecar driver.

Career
Blackburn's father owned and operated the Fayetteville, North Carolina racetrack.

He later competed at the historic Nashville Speedway USA against many future legendary drivers.

In 1967, he was part of a three driver crew that set a world speed record of 174 mph in a Smokey Yunick Z-28 Camaro at the Bonneville Salt Flats in a USAC/FIA event.

NASCAR career
Blackburn won the 1968 Daytona 300 from the pole.

He had 14 Top-10 and 4 Top-5 finishes in the Grand National Division. He drove in the series from the late 1950s to the early 1970s for Smokey Yunick and Petty Enterprises.

He almost won the 1961 Dixie 400 at Atlanta Motor Speedway in relief for Junior Johnson. He took Johnson's car to the lead with 5 laps to go after Fireball Roberts ran out of gas. However, Blackburn also ran out of gas on the final lap to hand the victory to David Pearson.

He retired after a racing injury.

External links

Obituary at nascar.com

1936 births
2006 deaths
NASCAR drivers
Sportspeople from Fayetteville, North Carolina
Racing drivers from North Carolina